William Clay Matthews Sr. (August 1, 1928 – March 23, 2017) was an American football tackle and patriarch of the Matthews family of football players. Matthews played for four seasons with the San Francisco 49ers of the NFL, the first in 1950. When the Korean War broke out, Matthews enlisted as a paratrooper for the Army's 82nd Airborne Division. In 1953, he returned to the 49ers for three seasons. He played college football at Georgia Tech. He was drafted in the 25th round of the 1949 NFL Draft by the Los Angeles Rams before being traded to the 49ers.

After completing his NFL career, he began a career in business, eventually becoming the president of Bell & Howell, a manufacturing company.

His father, H. L. Matthews, coached boxing, baseball, and track at The Citadel, The Military College of South Carolina in Charleston, South Carolina.

Matthews's sons, Clay Matthews Jr. and Bruce Matthews, played in the NFL in the 1970s to the 1990s, the latter inducted into the Pro Football Hall of Fame. Numerous grandsons have played in the NFL as well, including Clay Matthews III, Kevin, Jake, and Casey Matthews.

Matthews died at the age of 88 on March 23, 2017, in Mount Pleasant, South Carolina.

References

External links
DatabaseFootball stats
1955 49ers Team Issue Photo of Clay Matthews Sr.

1928 births
2017 deaths
American football defensive ends
American football offensive tackles
Georgia Tech Yellow Jackets football players
San Francisco 49ers players
Sportspeople from Charleston, South Carolina
People from Sugar Land, Texas
Players of American football from South Carolina
Matthews football family